This is a list of urban agglomerations with populations above 100,000 and cities (not part of urban agglomerations) with populations of less than or equal to 100,000,  as per 2011 census in the Indian state of Assam.

List of cities by population 

A list of urban agglomerations / cities having populations of 1 lakh and above in the Indian state of Assam.

Urban Agglomeration
In the census of India 2011, an Urban Agglomeration has been defined as follows:
An urban agglomeration is a continuous urban spread constituting a town and its adjoining outgrowths (OGs), or two or more physically contiguous towns together with or without outgrowths of such towns. An Urban Agglomeration must consist of at least a statutory town and its total population (i.e. all the constituents put together) should not be less than 20,000 as per the 2001 Census. In varying local conditions, there were similar other combinations which have been treated as urban agglomerations satisfying the basic condition of contiguity.

Constituents of Urban Agglomerations in Assam
The recorded urban agglomerations of Assam, with a population of 1 lakh or above, are noted below:
 Guwahati: Guwahati (M.Corp) and Narengi (OG).
 Silchar: Silchar (M.B), Silchar XI (OG), Tarapur VIII (OG), Tarapur VII (C.T), Kanakpur I (C.T), Ambicapur Part–X (C.T), Silchar Part–X (C.T), Uttar Krishnapur Part–I (C.T) and Kanakpur Part–II (C.T).
 Dibrugarh: Dibrugarh (M.B), Mahpowalimara Gohain Gaon (OG), Tekela Chiring Gaon (OG), Niz–Mankata (C.T) and Barbari (AMC area) (C.T).
 Jorhat: Jorhat (M.B), Chengeli Gaon (OG), Gohain Tekela Gaon (OG), Duliagaon (OG), Cinnamara Grant (OG), Toklai Chah Bagicha (OG), Sarbaibandha (OG), Chowdang No.1 (OG), Bohotia Gaon (OG), Sonari Gaon (OG), Kamalabaria Gaon (OG), Nakari Bamun Gaon (OG), Barbheta Chapari (OG), Kamalabaria N.C.(C.T), Kumar kaibarta Gaon (C.T) and Chekonidhara (C.T).
 Nagaon: Nagaon (M.B), Chota Haibor (C.T), Dimaruguri (C.T), Morongial (C.T), Kachalukhowa (OG), Nartam Gaon (OG)
 Bongaigaon: Bongaigaon (M.B), BRPL Township (C.T), New Bongaigaon Railway Colony (C.T), Chati Bor Gaon (C.T), Deuripara (OG), Dolaigaon Pt I, II & III (OG), Dhaligaon (OG), Bholaguri (OG), Birjhora T.E (OG), Borpathar Pt (OG), Simlaguri (OG), Kukurmari (Out Growth)
 Tinsukia: Tinsukia (M.B), Lahari Kachari Gaon (OG), Hengaluguri Gaon (OG), Bajatoli Gaon (OG), Hijuguri Gaon (OG), Tinsukia Town 24 No. Sheet (OG) – Ward No. 20, Kachujan Gaon (C.T) and Bahbari gaon (C.T).
 Tezpur: Tezpur (M.B), Bamun Chuburi Gaon (OG), Dekar Gaon (OG), Prabatia Gaon (OG), Hazarpar Dekar Gaon (OG), Deuri Gaon (OG), Barika Chuburi (C.T), Majgaon (C.T) and Gutlong Gaon (C.T).

List of municipal areas in Assam
A list of municipal areas based on population classes I – III, and IV and IV+ as per Ministry of Urban Development, Government of India are tabulated below:

 
—-

References

Assam
 
Cities by population